Ole Bernhard Øvergaard (29 November 1893 – 30 June 1972) was a Norwegian architect.

Ole Bernhard Øvergaard was born at Fredrikstad in Østfold, Norway. He graduated from the Norwegian Institute of Technology in 1916. 
Øvergaard worked as assistant to Magnus Poulsson in Christiania (now Oslo) in 1916 to 1917 and with Olaf Nordhagen in Trondheim in 1917. During the 1920s, he went on study trips to Sweden, Denmark, France, England and Italy. From 1922 he had his own practice in Christiania, the first two years together with Lars Backer.

Øvergaard specialized in hospital and was influential within the genre for decades. He also designed residential complexes. Important buildings designed by Øvergaard include the Norwegian Radium Hospital. Together with Nils Holter (1899-1995), he designed  Kringkastingshuset (commonly known as Det hvite hus), headquarters of Norwegian Broadcasting Corporation at Marienlyst in Oslo. Øvergaard also designed an extension to the Hotel Continental in Oslo (1960–61).   From 1956 to 1960 he presided over the National Association of Norwegian Architects.

References

Other sources
Sandnes, Svein;  Morten Krogvold  (2000) Det hvite hus. Byggehistorien til Kringkastinghuset på Marienlyst (Oslo)

1893 births
1972 deaths
People from Fredrikstad
Norwegian Institute of Technology alumni
Architects from Oslo